David Michael Stoupakis is an American surrealist/gothic artist. He is primarily a painter; he has also done artwork for Korn's album See You on the Other Side and Haloburn's debut album.

External links

David Stoupakis Beinart Gallery, Artist page

References

1974 births
Living people
Artists from Massachusetts
20th-century American painters
American male painters
21st-century American painters
21st-century American male artists
20th-century American male artists